In baseball statistics, a putout (PO) is awarded to a defensive player who (generally while in secure possession of the ball) records an out by one of the following methods:

 Tagging a runner with the ball when he is not touching a base (a tagout)
 Catching a batted or thrown ball and tagging a base to put out a batter or runner (a force out, or if done after a flyout, a doubling off)
 Catching a thrown ball and tagging a base to record an out on an appeal play
 Catching a third strike (a strikeout)
 Catching a batted ball on the fly (a flyout)
 Being positioned closest to a runner called out for interference

In a regulation nine-inning game, the winning team will always have a total of 27 putouts, as one putout is awarded for every defensive out made; this is one aspect of proving a box score.

While the abbreviation for putout is "PO", baseball scorekeeping typically records the specific manner in which an out was achieved, without explicitly noting which player is awarded the putout for common plays. For example, a strikeout is recorded without noting the putout by the catcher, with additional detail only provided as needed. For example, "Fryman struck out (catcher to first)" in a play-by-play summary in reference to an out recorded following an uncaught third strike, which indicates the putout was credited to the first baseman rather than the catcher.

All-time records

Content in this section has been updated through completion of the 2022 major-league season.

Career records

 Jake Beckley: 23,767 (1888–1907)
 Cap Anson: 22,572 (1871–1897)
 Ed Konetchy: 21,378 (1907–1921)
 Eddie Murray: 21,265 (1977–1997)
 Charlie Grimm: 20,722 (1916–1936)
 Stuffy McInnis: 20,120 (1909–1927)
 Mickey Vernon: 19,819 (1939–1960)
 Jake Daubert: 19,634 (1910–1924)
 Lou Gehrig: 19,525 (1923–1939)
 Joe Kuhel: 19,386 (1930–1947)
Note: each of the above players was primarily a first baseman.
Note: entering the  season, Joey Votto has the most putouts among active MLB players, with 14,440.
Source:

Single season records
The most putouts recorded by any player in a single major-league season is 1,846 by Jiggs Donahue, a first baseman with the 1907 Chicago White Sox.

Pitchers

Source:

Catchers

Source:

Note: as the majority of putouts by catchers occur on strikeouts, most single-season putout records for catchers have occurred in recent seasons (excepting the shortened  season), consistent with the increase in total strikeouts per MLB season (for example; 42,104 in 2021 compared to 34,489 in 2011).

First basemen

Source:

Second basemen

Source:

Third basemen

Source:

Shortstops

Source:

Left fielders

Source:

Center fielders

Source:

Right fielders

Source:

See also
 Assist (baseball)

References

Fielding statistics